{{Speciesbox
|image =
|image_caption =
|status = NT
|status_system = IUCN3.1
|status_ref = 
|genus = Asteriscus
|species = daltonii
|authority = (Webb) Walp.
|synonyms = 
Bubonium daltonii (Webb) HalvorsenNauplius daltonii (Webb) A. WilklundOdontospermum daltonii Webb
}}Asteriscus daltonii is a species of flowering plants of the family Asteraceae. The species is endemic to Cape Verde. Its local name is macela. It is listed as near threatened by the IUCN.

SubspeciesAsteriscus daltonii subsp. daltoniiAsteriscus daltonii subsp. vogeliiDescriptionAsteriscus daltonii grows in the shape of a tuft, up to 0.5 m height. It produces a large number of small yellow flowers.

Distribution and ecologyAsteriscus daltonii'' occurs in all islands of Cape Verde except Boa Vista.

References

Further reading

External links

daltonii
Endemic flora of Cape Verde